Actinotus gibbonsii is a plant in the family Apiaceae, native to the east coast of Australia.

It was first described in 1867 by Ferdinand von Mueller.

It is found in eucalypt woodlands and shrubby heaths in both Queensland and New South Wales.

References

External links 

gibbonsii
Flora of New South Wales
Flora of Queensland
Taxa named by Ferdinand von Mueller
Plants described in 1867